Onduparaka is a village in Ayivu County, Arua District. The soccer team Onduparaka FC got its name from this place and its official home ground - Greenlight Stadium can be found when you cut right from the main road some metres after the junction. Onduparaka is about a ten minute ride directly north from the Arua Hill Roundabout along Adumi Road which is a continuation of Arua Avenue. Ondu paraka in Lugbara language means 'sorghum stem'. A lot of sorghum used to be grown in Onduparaka and traded to the Democratic Republic of Congo, a few kilometres west.

References

Arua District
West Nile sub-region